Davis County was a county in Minnesota, created in 1855 from Cass, Nicollet, Pierce and Sibley counties. In 1862 the county was disbanded and what was left was merged into Chippewa and Lac qui Parle Counties. Davis County was attached to Stearns and Lac qui Parle Counties for county and or judicial purposes.

References

Former counties of Minnesota
Cass County, Minnesota
Chippewa County, Minnesota
Lac qui Parle County, Minnesota
Nicollet County, Minnesota
Sibley County, Minnesota